Kinu Ashton Rochford (born October 26, 1990) is an  American professional basketball player currently playing for Golden Eagle Ylli of the Kosovo Basketball Superleague. In 2017, he won the NKL championship with Garonne Sūduva-Mantinga.

High school
Rochford attended James Madison High School in Brooklyn where he averaged 10 points and 10 rebounds as a senior.

College career
After receiving no Division I scholarship offers, Rochford played for Globe Institute of Technology for two years, where he averaged 14 points and 14 rebounds per game while earning the Region XV Player of the Year honors as a sophomore. He transferred to Fairleigh Dickinson in 2011 on the behest of Fairleigh's head coach Greg Vetrone. During his first season with the school, Rochford posted modest numbers of 9.3 points and 6.8 rebounds per game. During his senior season, he was moved to the center positions and transformed into one of the best players of the Northeast Conference. For the season he averaged 14.7 points and 8.9 rebounds in 27 games.

Professional career
Rochford's first professional stop was in 2013 with Aris Leeuwarden in the Dutch Basketball League where he averaged 12.2 points and 7.8 rebounds in 10 games. In March 2014, he joined Elitzur Yavne of the Israeli second division. In 10 games he averaged a team leading 21.3 points and 11.2 rebounds.

In 2015, Rochford signed with ESSM Le Portel of the LNB Pro B, replacing injured Claude Marquis. In 22 games for Le Portel, he averaged 10.6 points and 5.6 rebounds per game.

Rochford spent the 2016–2017 season with Cheshire Phoenix in the British Basketball League. He was named the BBL Player of the Month in January after averaging 17.8 points and 14.0 rebounds per game. For the season, he averaged 19.6 points and 10.2 rebounds per game.

In 2016, Rochford joined Saint-Chamond Basket of the LNB Pro B. He left the club in middle of September, prior to the start of the season. In October 2016, he signed with BC Boncourt Red Team of the Swiss Basketball League where he averaged 13.0 points and 6.4 rebounds in 7 games before being released in end of November. In January 2017, he joined Sūduva-Mantinga of the Lithuanian National Basketball League where he averaged 11.2 points and 5.4 rebounds in 22 games, helping the team repeat as NKL champions.

In August 2017, he signed with Garonne ASPTT of the French NM2.

In October 2017, Rochford returned to the BBL and signed with Plymouth Raiders. In February 2018, Rochford was released. In 14 games for the Raiders, he averaged 12.5 points and 8.9 rebounds per game.

In September 2018, Rochford moved to the Icelandic Úrvalsdeild karla and signed with Þór Þorlákshöfn where he quickly became one of the league's best players. On 1 April 2019, Rochford scored 23 points in the fifth and deciding game of Þór's 3–2 upset against Tindastóll in the first round of the playoffs. With 7 seconds left of the game, he helped steal an inbound pass from Tindastóll that led to Halldór Garðar Hermannsson scoring the game winning basket with 2 seconds left. In the semi-finals, Þór lost to KR 1–3. During the regular season, he averaged 19.1 points and led the league with 12.2 rebounds per game.

Rochford continued his career in Iceland the following season, signing with 1. deild karla club Hamar in September 2019. On 17 October, he posted seasons high 27 points and 20 rebounds in a victory against Breiðablik. After only four games, where he averaged 11.8 points and 9.3 rebounds, Hamar released Rochford from his contract.

References

External links
Fairleigh Dickinson profile at fduknights.com
College statistics at Sports Reference
LNB Pro B statistics at lnb.fr
NKL statistics at basketnews.lt
Icelandic statistics at Icelandic Basketball Federation
Profile at realgm.com

1990 births
Living people
American expatriate basketball people in France
American expatriate basketball people in Iceland
American expatriate basketball people in Israel
American expatriate basketball people in Lithuania
American expatriate basketball people in the Netherlands
American expatriate basketball people in Switzerland
American expatriate basketball people in the United Kingdom
American men's basketball players
Basketball players from New York City
Aris Leeuwarden players
Elitzur Yavne B.C. players
ESSM Le Portel players
Fairleigh Dickinson Knights men's basketball players
Sportspeople from Brooklyn
Hamar men's basketball players
Þór Þorlákshöfn (basketball club) players
Úrvalsdeild karla (basketball) players
Forwards (basketball)
KB Ylli players